"Flim Flam Man" is a song written by Laura Nyro for the 1967 film The Flim-Flam Man.  It was first recorded and released by Nyro in February 1967 on her debut album More Than a New Discovery.

Barbra Streisand recording
The best-known version of the song was a hit for Barbra Streisand in 1971 (as "Hands Off The Man (Flim Flam Man)").  It was the final single of three releases from her Stoney End LP. The song was suggested to Streisand by record producer Richard Perry.

The song reached number 82 on the US Billboard Hot 100 in early 1971. It also reached number seven on the US Easy Listening chart. In Canada it peaked at number 62 (and #17 Adult Contemporary).

Chart performance

Other versions
"Flim Flam Man" has also been recorded by Peggy Lipton (1968), Robin Wilson (1971), Don Lane (1973), Janice Hoyte (1974) and Grace Cosgrove (2012).

References

External links
 

1967 songs
1971 singles
Songs written for films
Columbia Records singles
Songs written by Laura Nyro
Laura Nyro songs
Barbra Streisand songs
Song recordings produced by Richard Perry
Fanny (band)